Easy Street is an album by American jazz saxophonist Eric Marienthal released in 1997 and recorded for the Verve label. The album reached No. 13 on the Billboard Contemporary Jazz chart.

Track listing
 Easy Street (Lee Ritenour) – 5:17
 Tuesday's Delight (John Beasley) – 4:41
 New Jack Saturday (Marienthal/Ritenour) – 5:07
 Until You Come Back to Me (Morris Broadnax/Clarence Paul/Stevie Wonder) – 4:24
 Glow (Ritenour) – 5:06
 Half and Half (Charles Davis) – 4:36
 The Sun Died (Ray Charles) – 5:14
 Last Day of Summer (Rob Mullins) – 5:33
 Bourriquot (Beasley) – 4:35
 Secret Passions (Jeff Lorber/Marienthal) – 5:03
 Backstage (Marienthal/Mullins) – 4:59

Personnel
 Eric Marienthal – saxophone
 Rick Braun – trumpet
 John Beasley – keyboards
 Don Grusin – keyboards
 Rob Mullins – keyboards
 Russell Ferrante – piano
 Lee Ritenour – guitar
 Melvin Lee Davis – bass
 Sonny Emory – drums
 Hilary Jones – drums
 Cassio Duarte – percussion
 Vesta Williams – vocals

Charts

References

External links
 Eric Marienthal/Easy Street at Discogs
 Eric Marienthal/Easy Street at AllMusic
 Eric Marienthal's Official Site

1997 albums
Verve Records albums